Rudolph Pearce (born 18 December 1945) is a Jamaican footballer who played at both professional and international levels as a defender.

Career

Club career
Pearce spent two seasons in the NPSL and NASL, playing for the Atlanta Chiefs in 1967 and the New York Cosmos in 1971.

International career
Pearce was a member of the Jamaican national side between 1965 and 1968, appearing in six FIFA World Cup qualifying matches.

References

1945 births
Living people
Sportspeople from Kingston, Jamaica
Jamaican footballers
Jamaican expatriate footballers
Jamaica international footballers
Atlanta Chiefs players
New York Cosmos players
National Professional Soccer League (1967) players
North American Soccer League (1968–1984) players
Expatriate soccer players in the United States
Jamaican expatriate sportspeople in the United States
Association football defenders